Raphaël Domjan (born 19 January 1972) is a Swiss explorer and lecturer. He initiated and completed the first round-the-world trip using solar energy between September 2010 and May 2012 aboard the MS catamaran PlanetSolar. In 2015, he carried out the first polar solar navigation in the Arctic Ocean. He is the founder and pilot of the SolarStratos project, the first solar plane in the stratosphere. In August 2020, he made the first jump off of an electric plane and the first solar free fall. Raphaël Domjan is a pilot, mountaineer, diver and parachutist. He is a member of the Explorer Club of New York as well as the Société des Explorateurs Français.

Biography
Raphaël Domjan was born on 19 January 1972 in Neuchâtel, Switzerland and raised in Lausanne. In 2001, he co-founded the company Horus Networks Sàrl, the world's first solar web server.

In 2005, Domjan launched his first solar-powered round-the-world project. He founded PlanetSolar SA then, in 2007, the PlanetSolar Foundation. The PlanetSolar catamaran was built in Germany between 2008 and 2010, financed by the German entrepreneur Immo Stroeher.

In 2007, he travelled between Martinique and Dominica in the expedition of the Sun 21, the first solar boat to cross the Atlantic using solar energy. On this occasion he probably made the first dive from a solar boat in history. He also participated in the crossing of the United States north/south with Louis Palmer aboard the SolarTaxi, a solar and electric car.

Between 2010 and 2012, he made the first solar-powered round-the-world trip aboard PlanetSolar as the leader of the expedition.

In 2012, Domjan became a speaker and member of the Global Speaker Association. Since then he has given lectures regarding his world tour and explaining the reasons which pushed him to go on it.

In 2014, he brought together an international team and launched the SolarStratos mission, the objective of which was to reach the stratosphere with a solar plane. He plans to perform this record flight in 2023.

In 2015, along with the sailor Anne Quemere, he attempted to make the first crossing of the Northwest Passage in a solar powered kayak. Unfortunately, the weather conditions were unfavorable and they had to turn back after 300 km. The expedition nevertheless constitutes the first solar polar navigation in history.

On 25 August 2020, he jumped out of the SolarStratos HB-SXA solar plane in Payerne, Switzerland, with test pilot Miguel Iturmendi in command of the plane, the first jump off of an electric plane and the first free fall in solar history. He dropped several hundred meters and reached a speed of 150kmh.

In 2021, he became the first pilot of an electric plane flight with a head of state. On 14 September 2021 they took off with a Pipistrel Velis128 operated by Elektropostal from Nice airport in France with H.S.H. Albert II, Prince of Monaco and they flew over the Principality of Monaco. The plane flew for 30 minutes at a maximum altitude of 900 feet.

On June 18, 2022, Raphaël Domjan took off with HB-SXA solar plane from Sion airport in Switzerland with the adventurer Géraldine Fasnacht on board. She jumps from SolarStratos at more than 9,000 feet above the Swiss Alps and achieves the first wingsuit flight from an electric and solar plane. She lands in the village of Verbier in Switzerland at more than 1,000 meters above sea level.

PlanetSolar

First world tour using solar energy
The MS Tûranor PlanetSolar is the largest solar boat built to date and the first to have sailed around the world powered by solar energy. Having left Monaco on 27 September 2010, the PlanetSolar and her crew followed a route close to the Equator. After passing through the Atlantic Ocean, Panama Canal, Pacific Ocean, Indian Ocean, Suez Canal and Mediterranean, the boat reached Monaco on 4 May 2012. after 585 days and 60,006 km traveled.

PlanetSolar crew members during the first solar world tour (2010-2012)
Raphaël Domjan was the expedition leader of PlanetSolar during his round the world trip between 2010 and 2012. Patrick Marchesseau was the captain of PlanetSolar from Monaco to Nouméa, and Erwann le Rouzic took over from Nouméa until the return to the starting point, Monaco. They were accompanied by Jens Langwasser, a boatman, and Christian Oschenbein, an electrical engineer.

Firsts and records
During its round-the-world trip, PlanetSolar achieved a number of firsts: the first solar-powered round-the-world trip, first trip around the world by solar boat, and first crossing of the Indian Ocean and Red Sea with solar energy. In terms of records, PlanetSolar is also the largest solar boat in the world, and is the solar vehicle that traveled the longest distance (60,023 km).

Stamps
After the first round the world trip by solar boat, La Poste Monaco issued a postage stamp on the adventure PlanetSolar with a value of 77 centimes Euros representing PlanetSolar in Monaco.

SolarStratos
SolarStratos is a project officially begun in March 2014 by Raphaël Domjan. It is a two-seater solar plane built by Calin Gologan. Raphaël Domjan plans with his team to achieve an absolute altitude record. The SolarStratos mission should allow Raphaël Domjan to reach the stratosphere at more than 18,000 meters, an altitude never reached with a conventional propulsion aircraft.

According to SolarStratos, this project would aim to demonstrate that renewable energy makes it possible to go beyond what is possible with conventional propulsion methods. The SolarStratos aircraft was unveiled to the public on 7 December 2016. Ultimately, and after the record flight planned from 2024, Raphaël Domjan and the SolarStratos team wish to commercialize the technologies developed during the stratospheric mission, in particular by developing stratospheric solar drones.

Publications 
 Jaunin Roger, Domjan Raphaël (2010) -  « PlanetSolar », Lausanne: Favre, 144 pp.
 Jaunin Roger, Domjan Raphaël (2012) -  « PlanetSolar, Premier tour du monde à l’énergie solaire », Lausanne : Favre, 170 pp.
Javet Raphaëlle, Domjan Raphaël (2018) - « Pionniers et aventuriers de l'énergie solaire », Lausanne : Favre, 136 pp.

Links 

 Website of Raphaël Domjan
 Website of SolarStratos
 Website of the foundation PlanetSolar

Filmography 
 À la poursuite du soleil (2012) - documentary (52 minutes) directed by Olivier Vittel, produced by the PlanetSolar Foundation.
 SolarStratos « la naissance d’un rêve » (2021) – documentary (52 minutes) directed by Stéphane Chopard and Eric Beaufils and produced by Gédéon

References

External links
 Official website

 1972 births
 Swiss explorers
Living people
Swiss aviation record holders
People from Neuchâtel
People from Lausanne
Circumnavigators of the globe
Swiss skydivers
Swiss male divers
21st-century Swiss inventors
People associated with solar power